Sterzenbach may refer to:

Sterzenbach (Kahl), a river of Bavaria, Germany, tributary of the Kahl

People with that surname 
Benno Sterzenbach (1916–1985), German cinema and theatre actor and director
Norm Sterzenbach, American political strategist
Rüdiger Sterzenbach (born 1946), German professor, manager and sports official